OLY are post-nominal letters granted by the World Olympians Association (WOA) to registered athletes who have participated in the Olympic Games.

In November 2017 at the 8th International Olympic Committee (IOC) International Athletes' Forum, the World Olympians Association, with the support of the IOC Athletes' Commission, announced the OLY post-nominal letters initiative. The initiative allows Olympians to use the OLY lettering on any official documentation after their name. In addition to the letters, athletes will receive a World Olympians Association certificate celebrating their achievements when they apply for the post-nominals. The initiative is open to all athletes who have competed at the games and who uphold the values and practices of the Olympic Charter and the World Olympians Association Code of Conduct. IOC president Thomas Bach was the first athlete to receive the initials. Within five days, more than 1,000 Olympians had registered.

WOA President Joël Bouzou told Around the Rings: "It's time to recognize becoming an Olympian is like becoming a PhD. It takes 10 years. You learn about perseverance, you learn about equity, fair play. You are an example of this for society at large."

According to WOA's website, an OLY should bear responsibilities including "[working] to spread the spirit of Olympism" and "[representing] Olympians and the Olympic Movement in a positive and supportive manner at all times".

Two and a half years after the initiative began, over 14,000 Olympians had been granted the use of the OLY post-nominal letters and "growing [the] global OLY community" remained a priority of the World Olympians Association.

In 2022, the post-nominal letters PLY were introduced for athletes who have participated in the Paralympic Games.

References

External links 
 Olympians.org: OLY

Post-nominal letters
Olympic Games